Presa de Montejaque was a reservoir in the province of Málaga, Andalusia, Spain. It is also known as "Presa del Hundidero" and "Presa de los Caballeros"

River 

Le reservoir gets water from Gaduares river.

Construction 

The preliminary studies to build the wall started in 1917, and the project was abandoned in 1947, unable to keep water inside the walls

See also 
 List of reservoirs and dams in Andalusia

References

External links 
 Pictures of the path inside the reservoir 

Reservoirs in Andalusia